; (born April 28, 1936) is a Japanese manga artist from Izumiōtsu, Osaka. Nishimura's best-known work is the 4-koma comedy , which earned Nishimura the 1985 Bungeishunjū Manga Award and the Japanese Cartoonists' Association's Excellence Prize for 2000.

References

1936 births
Manga artists
Living people
People from Izumiōtsu, Osaka